Monahans can refer to:
Monahans, Texas
Monahans Sandhills State Park
Monahans-Wickett-Pyote Independent School District
The XScale PXA3xx chips, for which Monahans was a code-name

See also
Monahan
Monaghan